N-Methylpseudoephedrine is a stimulant.  It is a derivative of pseudoephedrine and an isomer of N-methylephedrine.  It is present in ephedra.

In organic chemistry, it is used in asymmetric synthesis.

References

Phenylethanolamines
Stimulants
Substituted amphetamines